Under the Clock (Pod Zegarem in Polish) was a Nazi torture centre in Lublin, Poland during World War II.

History
The Nazis used Lublin as the center of Operation Reinhard. The torture centre is in the centre of the city nearby a clock tower. Gestapo established cells in the basement and used them to interrogate Poles. It was used by the Nazis from 1939 - 1944.

Museum

A museum, known as Muzeum Martyrologii Pod Zegarem (The Museum of the Martyrology of Under the Clock) was established there to remember Polish history and the people who died at Under the Clock.

References in media
Under the Clock serves as a plot location in James A. Michener's novel Poland.

References

History of Lublin
1939 in Poland
1940 in Poland
1941 in Poland
1942 in Poland
1943 in Poland
1944 in Poland
Operation Reinhard